A TV aerial plug is a connector used to connect coaxial cables with each other and with terrestrial VHF/UHF roof antennas, antenna signal amplifiers, CATV distribution equipment, TV sets and FM / DAB-radio receivers.

In Europe and Australia the Belling-Lee connector (IEC 61169-2 radio-frequency coaxial connector of type 9,52) is commonly used for this purpose.

In other parts of the world the F connector is most commonly used.

Television terminology
RF connectors